Pedro Morilla Pineda (born 31 October 1972) is a Spanish retired footballer who played as a midfielder, and is the current manager of Wuhan Three Towns.

Playing career
Born in Seville, Andalusia, Morilla represented both Real Betis and Sevilla FC as a youth. After making his senior debut with CD Mairena, he moved to Segunda División B side Écija Balompié in 1994, appearing sparingly as his side achieved promotion to Segunda División.

Morilla made his debut in the second level on 3 December 1995, playing the last 14 minutes in a 1–2 home loss against CD Leganés. He left the club the following July, and signed for Talavera CF in the third level.

Morilla continued to appear in the lower leagues in the following years, representing Real Murcia, Burgos CF, Dos Hermanas CF, Talavera and CD Ciempozuelos. He retired with the latter in 2005, aged 32.

Managerial career
Immediately after retiring Morilla became a coach, being appointed in charge of his last club Ciempozuelos' youth setup. In January 2007, he was appointed in charge of the first team in the fourth division.

On 8 November 2007 Morilla returned to Talavera, now named manager. After suffering relegation he left the club, and in November 2008 he took charge of CD Móstoles.

On 1 October 2010 Morilla was appointed manager of CD Marchamalo, leaving in June of the following year. He subsequently joined Betis' backroom staff, also being in charge of the Juvenil and the reserve squads.

In August 2016, Morilla joined Granada CF's staff. On 9 July of the following year, he replaced Lluís Planagumà at the helm of the B-side.

Morilla was named manager of the first team in the second tier on 19 March 2018, replacing fired José Luis Oltra. On 30 April, however, he was sacked. 

He returned to the helm of the B-side in May 2018. However, Morilla was sacked in March 2019, after one win the last fourteen matches, which left Granada CF B at serious risk of relegation from the Segunda División B.

In July 2021, Morilla was appointed as caretaker manager of Wuhan Three Towns, where he worked as techniques director previously. In December 2021, he was promoted to manager for winning 14 matches in a row. In December 2022, he led the Wuhan Three Towns to their first ever Chinese Super League title.

Managerial statistics

Honours

Manager
 Wuhan Three Towns
 China League One: 2021

 Chinese Super League: 2022

References

External links

1972 births
Living people
Footballers from Seville
Spanish footballers
Association football midfielders
Segunda División players
Segunda División B players
Tercera División players
Écija Balompié players
Real Murcia players
Burgos CF footballers
Spanish football managers
Granada CF managers
Chinese Super League managers
China League One managers